Pat O'Neill may refer to:

Sportspeople
Pat O'Neill (American football) (born 1971), American football player
Pat O'Neill (Dublin footballer) (born 1950), Dublin Gaelic footballer and manager
Pat O'Neill (Galway footballer) (born 1956), Galway Gaelic footballer
Pat O'Neill (Kilkenny hurler) (born 1970), hurler for Kilkenny
Pat O'Neill (Tipperary hurler), hurler for Tipperary

Other people
Pat O'Neill (filmmaker) (born 1939), American experimental filmmaker
Pat O'Neill (Kilkenny politician) (born 1958), member of Seanad Éireann

See also

Patrick O'Neill (disambiguation)
Patrick O'Neal (disambiguation)